Pselaptrichus is a genus of ant-loving beetles in the family Staphylinidae. There are more than 30 described species in Pselaptrichus.

Species
These 38 species belong to the genus Pselaptrichus:

 Pselaptrichus auctumnus Chandler, 1983
 Pselaptrichus burdicki Schuster & Marsh, 1956
 Pselaptrichus carinatus Marsh & Schuster, 1954
 Pselaptrichus cavatus Marsh & Schuster, 1954
 Pselaptrichus chandleri Schuster & Marsh, 1956
 Pselaptrichus cornus Chandler, 1983
 Pselaptrichus curiosus Park, 1953
 Pselaptrichus cuspidatus Schuster & Marsh, 1956
 Pselaptrichus frigidus Schuster & Marsh, 1956
 Pselaptrichus gibbosus Marsh & Schuster, 1954
 Pselaptrichus helferi Schuster & Marsh, 1956
 Pselaptrichus hocus Schuster & Marsh, 1956
 Pselaptrichus incognitus Schuster & Marsh, 1956
 Pselaptrichus intimus Schuster & Marsh, 1956
 Pselaptrichus levinei Schuster & Marsh, 1956
 Pselaptrichus loebli Chandler, 2003
 Pselaptrichus magaliae Chandler, 1983
 Pselaptrichus marshi Chandler, 1983
 Pselaptrichus minimus Schuster & Marsh, 1956
 Pselaptrichus oculatus Marsh & Schuster, 1954
 Pselaptrichus ornatus Marsh & Schuster, 1954
 Pselaptrichus parki Schuster & Marsh, 1956
 Pselaptrichus pennatus Schuster & Marsh, 1956
 Pselaptrichus perditus Schuster & Marsh, 1956
 Pselaptrichus perfidus Schuster & Marsh, 1956
 Pselaptrichus plusculus Park & Wagner, 1962
 Pselaptrichus propinquus Schuster & Marsh, 1956
 Pselaptrichus proprius Schuster & Marsh, 1956
 Pselaptrichus rectus Marsh & Schuster, 1954
 Pselaptrichus rothi Park, 1953
 Pselaptrichus shastensis Schuster & Marsh, 1956
 Pselaptrichus silvanus Schuster & Marsh, 1956
 Pselaptrichus similis Schuster & Marsh, 1956
 Pselaptrichus spinosus Marsh & Schuster, 1954
 Pselaptrichus tenuis Schuster & Marsh, 1956
 Pselaptrichus tuberculipalpus Brendel, 1889
 Pselaptrichus vanus Schuster & Marsh, 1956
 Pselaptrichus venustrus Schuster & Marsh, 1956

References

Further reading

 
 

Pselaphinae
Articles created by Qbugbot